Arnolds Park Amusement Park is a historic amusement park in Arnolds Park, Iowa. The park offers 23 rides on its  site. Arnolds Park consists of a full-fledged amusement park plus Go-Karts and a River Cruise on the West Okoboji Lake. Today, it is surrounded by several landmarks. The park is home to Legend, An ACE Coaster Landmark. Legend, which carried its first riders in 1927, is believed to be the 13th oldest wooden roller coaster in the U.S. In 2012, the amusement park was selected as one of the fifteen best in the Midwest region by Midwest Living magazine.

Arnolds Park offers picnicking, a catering service, an arcade, and live entertainment including school bands, dance groups and magic shows.

The park uses an all-day ride and waterpark wristbands or pay-by-ride system. Admission to enter the park itself is free.

Rides and attractions

References

External links

Amusement parks in Iowa